I Believe You Liar is the debut studio album by Australian singer-songwriter Washington. It was released on Mercury Records in Australia on 30 July 2010. The album peaked at number 3 on the ARIA Charts charts.

At the J Awards of 2010, the album was nominated for Australian Album of the Year.

Background 
I Believe You Liar is largely composed of tracks from Washington's previous three EP releases, Clementine (2008), How to Tame Lions (2009), and Rich Kids (2010). Out of the twelve tracks on the original Australian edition, five were included previously on these releases. Although the album somewhat lacked new material, it was a commercial success in Washington's native Australia, peaking at number 3 on the ARIA Albums Chart. A special edition of the album was released simultaneously, including a bonus CD which included all other tracks from Washington's previous three EPs.

In October 2011, the album was released internationally in the UK and US with new cover artwork, and a revised track listing omitting "Clementine" and including two new tracks from Washington's then-upcoming EP Insomnia, which was released exclusively in Australia two weeks later. This edition of the album was also slightly remixed and featured alternate production on some songs, and was also released in Australia as a re-release on the same day. Compared to the original release, the album was a commercial flop, failing to chart in both the UK and US, and failed to re-enter the album into the ARIA Top 50.

Singles 
Overall, five singles were released from I Believe You Liar, as well as single from previously released extended plays.

"Sunday Best" and "The Hardest Part" were released exclusively in Australia in August and October 2010 following the album's release in July.

"Clementine" was released as the album's lead and only single in the US in June 2011, despite the song not being included on the US edition of the album.

"Holy Moses" was released in Australia and the UK in August 2011 as the album's third single, and lead single from Insomnia in Australia, and as the album's lead single in the UK. The album's title track, "I Believe You Liar" was released as the album's second single in the UK in November 2011 and fifth and final single overall.

Critical reception 

Alexey Eremenko from Allmusic gave I Believe You Liar a mixed-to-positive review, criticizing the album's production and questioned its authenticity, and called it a "missed chance". However, he praised the upbeat atmosphere and lyrics, and said the album "packs plenty of potential and some downright good songs".

Track listing

Charts

Weekly charts

Year-end charts

Certifications

Release history

References 

2010 debut albums
APRA Award winners
ARIA Award-winning albums
Megan Washington albums